Percival Henry Rowe (4 January 1896 – 27 August 1976) was a player and coach in the Victorian Football League (VFL) and Victorian Football Association (VFA).

In 1915, Rowe played for Lake Rovers Football Club in the Ovens and Murray Football League grand final when Rutherglen defeated Lake Rovers.

In 1924 Percy Rowe coached the Albury Football Club.

Percy Rowe coached the Wangaratta Football Club to the 1925 Ovens and Murray Football League premiership. Wangaratta Football Club were runner-up to St. Patrick's Football Club in 1926 under Rowe's coaching. 

He then returned to Collingwood Football Club and played in their 1927 and 1928 premierships.

Rowe is most notable for his time as captain-coach of the Northcote Football Club, where he oversaw the most successful period in the club's history. Rowe played and coached at Northcote from 1929 until 1934, winning four premierships (1929, 1932-33-34) and finishing runners-up twice (1930–31) in those six seasons.

After leaving Northcote, Rowe was the coach of the Fitzroy Football Club in 1935 and the Carlton Football Club for only the 1937 season before he was replaced by captain-coach Brighton Diggins.  He is the father of Des Rowe, who captained Richmond.

References

Collingwood Football Club players
Collingwood Football Club Premiership players
Fitzroy Football Club coaches
Carlton Football Club coaches
Northcote Football Club players
Northcote Football Club coaches
Coburg Football Club coaches
Rutherglen Football Club players
1896 births
Australian rules footballers from Victoria (Australia)
1976 deaths
Two-time VFL/AFL Premiership players